2-Hydroxymuconate-6-semialdehyde dehydrogenase ([gene],  [gene] ) is an enzyme with systematic name (2E,4Z)-2-hydroxy-6-oxohexa-2,4-dienoate:NAD+ oxidoreductase. This enzyme catalyses the following chemical reaction

 2-hydroxymuconate-6-semialdehyde + NAD+ + H2O  (2Z,4E)-2-hydroxyhexa-2,4-dienedioate + NADH + 2 H+

This substrate for this enzyme is formed by meta ring cleavage of catechol (EC 1.13.11.2, catechol 2,3-dioxygenase), and is an intermediate in the bacterial degradation of several aromatic compounds.

References

External links 
 

EC 1.2.1